St. Helena Parish Chapel of Ease Ruins is a historic site in Frogmore, South Carolina  on Saint Helena Island.

The Anglican chapel was constructed in 1740 by planters on Saint Helena Island as a chapel of ease for parishioners who had difficulty traveling to worship at the Parish Church of St. Helena in Beaufort, South Carolina. The ruins were added to the National Register of Historic Places in 1988.

References

External links

Historic American Buildings Survey in South Carolina
Anglican churches in South Carolina
Properties of religious function on the National Register of Historic Places in South Carolina
Churches completed in 1740
Churches in Beaufort County, South Carolina
Former churches in South Carolina
National Register of Historic Places in Beaufort County, South Carolina
18th-century Episcopal church buildings